Faiditus is a genus of comb-footed spiders that was first described by Eugen von Keyserling in 1884.

Species
 it contains fifty-nine species, all found in the Americas except for F. xiphias, found in Asia:
F. acuminatus (Keyserling, 1891) – Brazil, Argentina
F. affinis (O. Pickard-Cambridge, 1880) – Brazil
F. alticeps (Keyserling, 1891) – Brazil, Paraguay
F. altus (Keyserling, 1891) – Venezuela, Brazil
F. amates (Exline & Levi, 1962) – Mexico, Guatemala
F. americanus (Taczanowski, 1874) – USA to Brazil, Argentina
F. amplifrons (O. Pickard-Cambridge, 1880) – Panama to Argentina
F. analiae (González & Carmen, 1996) – Brazil
F. arthuri (Exline & Levi, 1962) – Panama
F. atopus (Chamberlin & Ivie, 1936) – Panama to Ecuador
F. bryantae (Exline & Levi, 1962) – Costa Rica, Panama
F. cancellatus (Hentz, 1850) – USA, Canada, Bahama Is.
F. caronae (González & Carmen, 1996) – Brazil
F. caudatus (Taczanowski, 1874) – USA, Caribbean to Argentina
F. chicaensis (González & Carmen, 1996) – Argentina
F. chickeringi (Exline & Levi, 1962) – Panama
F. cochleaformus (Exline, 1945) – Ecuador, Peru
F. convolutus (Exline & Levi, 1962) – Guatemala to Peru, Brazil
F. cordillera (Exline, 1945) – Ecuador
F. cristinae (González & Carmen, 1996) – Brazil
F. cubensis (Exline & Levi, 1962) – Cuba
F. darlingtoni (Exline & Levi, 1962) – Jamaica, Hispaniola
F. davisi (Exline & Levi, 1962) – USA, Mexico
F. dracus (Chamberlin & Ivie, 1936) – USA to Paraguay
F. duckensis (González & Carmen, 1996) – Brazil
F. ecaudatus Keyserling, 1884 (type) – Brazil
F. exiguus (Exline & Levi, 1962) – Cuba, Puerto Rico
F. fulvus (Exline & Levi, 1962) – Brazil
F. gapensis (Exline & Levi, 1962) – Jamaica
F. gertschi (Exline & Levi, 1962) – Panama
F. globosus (Keyserling, 1884) – USA to Ecuador
F. godmani (Exline & Levi, 1962) – Guatemala
F. iguazuensis (González & Carmen, 1996) – Argentina
F. jamaicensis (Exline & Levi, 1962) – Jamaica
F. laraensis (González & Carmen, 1996) – Argentina
F. leonensis (Exline & Levi, 1962) – Mexico
F. maculosus (O. Pickard-Cambridge, 1898) – USA, Mexico
F. mariae (González & Carmen, 1996) – Argentina
F. morretensis (González & Carmen, 1996) – Brazil, Argentina
F. nataliae (González & Carmen, 1996) – Argentina
F. peruensis (Exline & Levi, 1962) – Peru
F. plaumanni (Exline & Levi, 1962) – Brazil
F. proboscifer (Exline, 1945) – Ecuador, Peru
F. quasiobtusus (Exline & Levi, 1962) – Puerto Rico, Virgin Is.
F. rossi (Exline & Levi, 1962) – Colombia
F. sicki (Exline & Levi, 1962) – Brazil
F. solidao (Levi, 1967) – Brazil
F. spinosus (Keyserling, 1884) – Venezuela, Peru
F. striatus (Keyserling, 1891) – Brazil
F. subdolus (O. Pickard-Cambridge, 1898) – USA to Guatemala
F. subflavus (Exline & Levi, 1962) – Peru
F. sullana (Exline, 1945) – Peru
F. taeter (Exline & Levi, 1962) – Mexico
F. ululans (O. Pickard-Cambridge, 1880) – Mexico to Brazil
F. vadoensis (González & Carmen, 1996) – Argentina
F. woytkowskii (Exline & Levi, 1962) – Peru
F. xiphias (Thorell, 1887) – Myanmar, India (Nicobar Is.) to Japan, Indonesia (Krakatau)
F. yacuiensis (González & Carmen, 1996) – Argentina
F. yutoensis (González & Carmen, 1996) – Argentina

See also
 List of Theridiidae species

References

Araneomorphae genera
Spiders of Asia
Spiders of Central America
Spiders of North America
Spiders of South America
Taxa named by Eugen von Keyserling
Theridiidae